Mississippi to Mali is an album by Corey Harris. It was released in 2003 through Rounder Records.

Track listing 
 "Coahoma" (Harris) - 1:49
 "Big Road Blues" (Traditional) - 3:05
 "Special Rider Blues" (James) - 4:54
 "Tamalah" (Toure) - 6:41
 "Back Atcha" (Thomas) - 3:27
 "Rokie" (Traditional) - 3:46
 "La Chanson des Bozos" (Traditional) - 4:20
 "Mr. Turner" (Harris) - 4:43
 "Cypress Grove Blues" (James) - 3:02
 "Station Blues" (Traditional) - 2:41
 ".44 Blues" (Traditional) - 7:28
 "Njarka" (Toure) - 3:56
 "Charlene" (Harris) - 5:01
 "Catfish Blues" (Petway) - 6:39
 "Dark Was the Night, Cold Was the Ground" (Johnson) - 3:28

Sources

Corey Harris albums
2003 albums
Rounder Records albums